Mimolophia brunnea is a species of beetle in the family Cerambycidae, and the only species in the genus Mimolophia. It was described by Breuning in 1940.

References

Desmiphorini
Beetles described in 1940
Monotypic beetle genera